In mathematics, an automorphic L-function is a function L(s,π,r) of a complex variable s, associated to an automorphic representation π of a reductive group G over a global field and a finite-dimensional complex representation r of the Langlands dual group LG of G, generalizing the Dirichlet L-series of a Dirichlet character and the Mellin transform of a modular form.

 and  gave surveys of automorphic L-functions.

Properties

Automorphic -functions should have the following properties (which have been proved in some cases but are still conjectural in other cases).

Here the automorphic representation  is a tensor product of the representations  of local groups.

The L-function is expected to have an analytic continuation as a meromorphic function of all complex , and satisfy a functional equation

where the factor  is a product of "local constants"

almost all of which are 1.

General linear groups

 constructed the automorphic L-functions for general linear groups with r the standard representation (so-called standard L-functions) and verified analytic continuation and the functional equation, by using a generalization of the method in Tate's thesis. Ubiquitous in the Langlands Program are Rankin-Selberg products of representations of GL(m) and GL(n). The resulting Rankin-Selberg L-functions satisfy a number of analytic properties, their functional equation being first proved via the Langlands–Shahidi method.

In general, the Langlands functoriality conjectures imply that automorphic L-functions of a connected reductive group are equal to products of automorphic L-functions of general linear groups. A proof of Langlands functoriality would also lead towards a thorough understanding of the analytic properties of automorphic L-functions.

References

Automorphic forms
Zeta and L-functions
Langlands program